Mr. Hockey: The Gordie Howe Story is a Canadian-American television film, which premiered in 2013. Directed by Andy Mikita, the film centres on hockey legend Gordie Howe's 1973 return to playing hockey with the new Houston Aeros of the World Hockey Association.

The film stars Michael Shanks as Howe, Kathleen Robertson as his wife Colleen Howe and Martin Cummins as Aeros coach Bill Dineen, as well as Lochlyn Munro, Dylan Playfair, Andrew Herr and Donnelly Rhodes in supporting roles.

The film premiered on April 28, 2013, on CBC Television in Canada, and May 4, 2013, on Hallmark Channel in the United States.

The film received four Canadian Screen Award nominations at the 2nd Canadian Screen Awards, for Best TV Movie (Shanks), Best Lead Actor in a Television Film or Miniseries (Shanks), Best Lead Actress in a Television Film or Miniseries (Robertson) and Best Direction in a Dramatic Program or Miniseries (Mikita). In 2020, the film was scheduled for rebroadcast on CBC's Movie Night in Canada, its temporary replacement for Hockey Night in Canada during the NHL shutdown in the COVID-19 pandemic.

References

External links

2013 television films
2013 films
English-language Canadian films
American biographical films
American ice hockey films
American television films
Canadian biographical films
Canadian ice hockey films
CBC Television original films
Brightlight Pictures films
Canadian drama television films
2010s American films
2010s Canadian films